Christmas with Friends is the third studio album from Swedish singer and model Måns Zelmerlöw. It was released on 15 November 2010 in Sweden, and is a Christmas album. The album failed to chart on the Swedish Albums Chart.

Track listing

Release history

References

2010 Christmas albums
Christmas albums by Swedish artists
Pop Christmas albums
Måns Zelmerlöw albums
Warner Music Sweden albums